The University of North Carolina School of Law is the law school of the University of North Carolina at Chapel Hill. Established in 1845, Carolina Law is among the oldest law schools in the United States and is the oldest law school in North Carolina.

History
Following discussion in the North Carolina legal community, on December 12, 1842, the Trustees of the University of North Carolina authorized the University President, David L. Swain, to review and establish a law professorship. In 1845, William Horn Battle was named the first professor of law, and legal instruction began at the university. In the years following, assistant professors and later an organized faculty and law library were added.

In 1915, Margaret Berry became the first female to graduate from the law school. In the 1920s, the school began taking on much of the character of a modern law school, after the American Bar Association first published guidelines for schools. University President Harry Woodburn Chase was instrumental in leading the efforts for this reorganization over notable opposition, including the governor of North Carolina.

In June 1951, Harvey Beech, J. Kenneth Lee, Floyd McKissick, and James Robert Walker Jr. became the first four black students enrolled at the law school. McKissick and other black students had argued in court that a state law school for blacks in Durham was not equal to that in Chapel Hill. In March 1951, a U.S. Court of Appeals agreed and ordered UNC to stop excluding black applicants. Sylvia X. Allen became the first black female student to graduate in 1962, and did so as the mother of six children.

, the law school has 634 enrolled students and a student-faculty ratio of 11.3 to 1. The entering class of first-year law students in 2017 was composed of 213 students from 25 states, the District of Columbia, and China. Sixty-three percent of students were from North Carolina, and students of color made up 26 percent of the class. Fifty-one percent of incoming students were female, while 49% were male.

The University of North Carolina School of Law is ranked 23rd by U.S. News & World Report.

Facilities

The law school is currently located in Van Hecke-Wettach Hall, towards the southeastern side of the Chapel Hill campus, neighboring the School of Government and several athletic facilities. Van Hecke-Wettach Hall includes the Kathrine R. Everett Law Library, located primarily on four floors on the back side of the building.

Centers and programs
The UNC School of Law is home to several centers that focus on issues of state and national interest:
 Center for Banking and Finance - Lissa Broome, Director
 Center for Civil Rights - Theodore Shaw, Director. 
 Center for Climate, Energy, Environment & Economics - Jonas J. Monast, Director
 North Carolina Coastal Resources Law, Planning and Policy Center
 UNC Center for Media Law and Policy - David Ardia, Co-Director
 Director Diversity Initiative
 Intellectual Property Initiative
 UNC School of Law Medical Child Abuse Initiative
 Prosecutors and Politics Project
 N.C. Poverty Research Fund

Clinics
Clinics provide students with the opportunity to learn legal theory and put the legal theory to practice.
 Civil Legal Assistance Clinic
 Community Development Law Clinic
 Consumer Financial Transactions Clinic
 Domestic and Sexual Violence Clinic
 Immigration Clinic
 Intellectual Property Clinic
 Military and Veterans Law Clinic
 Youth Justice Clinic

Law journals
The school is home to five student-edited law journals. The oldest, the North Carolina Law Review, was founded in 1922. This journal features an annual North Carolina issue reviewing developments in the state's law.
 First Amendment Law Review
 North Carolina Banking Institute Journal
 North Carolina Civil Rights Law Review
 North Carolina Journal of International Law
 North Carolina Journal of Law & Technology (NC JOLT)
 North Carolina Law Review

Employment 
According to employment disclosures required by the American Bar Association, 92.46% of the Class of 2020 obtained full-time, long-term, JD-required, JD advantage, or professional employment after graduation. A small number enrolled in further graduate studies.

Costs
The total cost of attendance (indicating the cost of tuition, fees, and living expenses) at UNC for the 2017-2018 academic year was $49,562 for North Carolina residents and $66,193 for out-of-state students. The Law School Transparency estimated debt-financed cost of attendance for three years is $176,368 for residents and $243,846 for nonresidents.

Notable alumni

There are more than 10,000 alumni of the University of North Carolina School of Law. Roughly 40 percent of practicing North Carolina attorneys are Carolina Law graduates, more than any other law school in North Carolina. Many have gone on to notable roles, including government offices, such as former US Senator and 2004 Vice Presidential candidate John Edwards, and former Chief of Staff to the President of the United States and former US Congressman, Mick Mulvaney. Additionally, many have served in positions in the North Carolina state government. Among these are the current and recent North Carolina governors (Cooper, Hunt, Holshouser, Moore, and Sanford) and (as of the 2021 term) three of seven North Carolina Supreme Court justices (Barringer, Newby and Hudson).

Leadership
 William Horn Battle, 1845-1868; 1877-1879 (as professor of law)
 Kemp Plummer Battle, 1879-1881 (as professor of law)
 John Manning Jr., 1881-1899 (as professor of law)
 James C. MacRae, 1899-1909 (as dean)
 Lucius Polk McGehee, 1910-1923 (as dean)
 Merton Leroy Ferson, 1924-1926
 Charles T. McCormick, 1927-1931
 Maurice Taylor Van Hecke, 1931-1941
 Robert Hasley Wettach, 1941-1949
 Henry Brandis Jr., 1949-1964
 James Dickson Phillips Jr., 1964-1974
 Robert Gray Byrd, 1974-1979
 Kenneth S. Broun, 1979-1987
 Judith Welch Wegner, 1989-1999
 Gene Nichol, 1999-2005
 John "Jack" Charles Boger, 2006-2015
 Martin H. Brinkley, 2015–Present

References 

Law schools in North Carolina
University of North Carolina
1845 establishments in North Carolina